The following is a partial list of unproduced Alfred Hitchcock projects, in roughly chronological order. During a career that spanned more than half a century, Alfred Hitchcock directed over fifty films, and worked on a number of others which never made it beyond the pre-production stage.

Number 13 (1922) 

This was to be Hitchcock's directorial debut, after working in the art department on twelve films previously, but budgetary problems canceled the production after only a few scenes were shot. Studio records indicate that its title was to be Mrs. Peabody.

Forbidden Territory (1933–1934) 
British thriller writer Dennis Wheatley had been a guest on the set of many of the early Hitchcock movies, and when The Forbidden Territory was published in January 1933, he presented the director with a copy.  Hitchcock so enjoyed the book that he wanted to make a film of it, but he was just in the process of moving to Gaumont-British studios to work for Michael Balcon; he asked Wheatley to hold onto the rights until he could persuade his new employer to purchase them.   When the time came, however, Balcon wasn't interested and instead insisted that Hitchcock direct the musical Waltzes from Vienna.  Hitchcock then approached Richard Wainwright, a distinguished producer who had been head of UFA films in Germany, and had recently relocated to Britain. Wainwright was keen to pick up a promising subject for his first British film, and immediately bought the rights.  Although there was a verbal understanding that Hitchcock was to direct, Balcon refused to release him, and instead began production of The Man Who Knew Too Much.  Wainwright, committed to studio space, technicians and actors, had no alternative but to proceed without him, and placed the film into the hands of American director Phil Rosen. In 1936, at Hitchcock's instigation, Wheatley wrote a screenplay The Bombing of London, but the controversial project could find no backer and was shelved.

Greenmantle (1939–1942) 
Hitchcock very much wanted to direct a follow-up to The 39 Steps, and he felt that Greenmantle by John Buchan was a superior book. He proposed that the film would star Cary Grant and Ingrid Bergman, but the rights from the Buchan estate proved too expensive.

Unnamed Titanic project (1939) 
Indeed, it was to be the first production of Hitchcock’s new contract under David O. Selznick, who had long wished to make a lavish telling of the event. Several problems complicated its genesis, including conflicts with legalities, objections from the British shipping industry, and competing plans from other producers. Both Hitchcock and Selznick eventually became disenchanted with the project and they proceeded with Rebecca instead.

Escape (1940) 
Hitchcock desperately wanted to direct Norma Shearer, Robert Taylor, and Conrad Veidt in one of the first World War II dramas, Escape. Hitchcock, a long-time admirer of Shearer's acting, had sought for years to find a suitable project for her. However, Hitchcock was shut out of the project when the novel Escape by Ethel Vance (pen name of Grace Zaring Stone) was purchased by Metro-Goldwyn-Mayer. Hitchcock knew he could never work for the notorious MGM studio head Louis B. Mayer, who selected Mervyn LeRoy to produce and direct the film, which indeed starred Shearer and was released in late 1940. Years later, Hitchcock made the statement about the lack of true Hollywood leading ladies with the quote, "Where are the Norma Shearers?"

Unmade Nazi documentary (1945) 

In 1945, Hitchcock was brought in as a supervising director for a documentary film about Nazi crimes and Nazi concentration camps. The film was originally to include segments produced by military film units from the United Kingdom, the United States, France, and the Soviet Union. Cold War developments meant that the USSR segment was withdrawn, and the film remained uncompleted, with some footage kept in the collection of the Imperial War Museum. 

However, a reconstruction of the film was aired as Memory of the Camps in 1984–1985 in the United Kingdom and the United States. The United States version was shown on the PBS series Frontline on May 7, 1985. In October 2014, a new documentary about the unfinished film, Night Will Fall, premiered at the BFI London Film Festival.

Hamlet (late 1940s) 
In the late 1940s, Hitchcock had plans to make a modernized version of the Shakespeare story. Hitchcock's Shakespearean vision was of a "psychological melodrama" (set in contemporary England, and starring Cary Grant in the title role). The project was scrapped when Hitchcock's studio caught wind of a potential lawsuit from a professor who had already written a modern-day version of Hamlet.

The Bramble Bush (1951–1953) 
The Bramble Bush would have been an adaptation of a 1948 novel by David Duncan about a disaffected Communist agitator who, on the run from the police, is forced to adopt the identity of a murder suspect. The story would be adapted to take place in Mexico and San Francisco. 

The project, originally to come after I Confess (1953) as a Transatlantic Pictures production to be released by Warner Bros., had a high budget which made it a difficult project. Hitchcock did not feel that any of the scripts lifted the movie beyond an ordinary chase story, and Warner Brothers allowed him to kill the project and move on to Dial M for Murder (1954). 

The theme of the hero assuming a dangerous new identity would become the kernel of the script for North by Northwest (1959). Michelangelo Antonioni's  film The Passenger (1975) tells a similar story, but is not based on Duncan's book. The 1960 film The Bramble Bush, starring Richard Burton and Barbara Rush, and released by Warner Bros., was based on a Charles Mergendahl novel, and had no relation to Duncan's book.

Flamingo Feather (1956) 
This was to be a big-budget adaptation of Laurens van der Post's novel of political intrigue in Southern Africa. James Stewart was expected to take the lead role of an adventurer who discovers a concentration camp for Communist agents; Hitchcock wanted Grace Kelly to play the love interest. 

After a disappointing research trip to South Africa where he concluded that he would have difficulty filming, especially on a budget – and with confusion of the story's politics and the impracticability of casting Kelly, Hitchcock deferred the project and instead cast Stewart in The Man Who Knew Too Much (1956). Hitchcock travelled to Livingstone near Victoria Falls and was a guest of Harry Sossen, one of the prominent inhabitants of this pioneer town. Hitchcock and Sossen were photographed together at the newly opened Livingstone Airport and the event was recorded in the local papers. Sossen was also in communication with Laurens van der Post who gave him a signed copy of the book Flamingo Feather during a visit to the Falls (staying at the Victoria Falls Hotel). Sossen's daughter Marion is in possession of the book today and a number of letters between her father and van der Post.

No Bail for the Judge (1958–1961) 
No Bail for the Judge was to be an adaptation of a thriller novel of the same title by Henry Cecil about a London barrister who, with the assistance of a gentleman thief, has to defend her father, a High Court judge, when he is accused of murdering a prostitute. In a change of pace from his usual blonde actresses, Audrey Hepburn would have played the barrister, with Laurence Harvey as the thief, and John Williams as the Hepburn character's father. Some sources, including Writing with Hitchcock author Steven DeRosa say that Hitchcock's interest in the novel started in the summer of 1954 while filming To Catch a Thief, and that Hitchcock hoped to have John Michael Hayes write the screenplay. Hepburn was an admirer of Hitchcock's work and had long wanted to appear in one of his films.

Samuel A. Taylor, scenarist for Vertigo and Topaz, wrote the screenplay after Ernest Lehman rejected it. The Taylor screenplay included a scene, not in the original novel, where the heroine disguises herself as a prostitute and has to fend off a rapist. Hepburn left the film, partly because of the near-rape scene, but primarily due to a pregnancy. (Hepburn suffered a miscarriage during the filming of the 1960 film The Unforgiven and then gave birth to son Sean Ferrer in July 1960.) Laurence Harvey still ended up working with Hitchcock in 1959, however, on an episode that Hitchcock directed of Alfred Hitchcock Presents.

Without Hepburn, the project didn't have the same appeal for Hitchcock. Changes in British law concerning prostitution and entrapment — changes that took place after the novel was published — made some aspects of the screenplay implausible. Hitchcock told Paramount Pictures it was better to write off $200,000 already spent on the film's development than to spend another $3 million for a film he no longer cared for. In the fall of 1959, a Paramount publicity brochure titled "Success in the Sixties!" had touted No Bail for the Judge as an upcoming feature film starring Hepburn, to be filmed in Technicolor and VistaVision.

The Wreck of the Mary Deare (1959) 
The Hammond Innes novel was optioned by Metro-Goldwyn-Mayer with the intention of having Hitchcock direct the picture, starring Gary Cooper and Burt Lancaster. Hitchcock had long wanted to work with Cooper, who had been asked to star in Foreign Correspondent in 1940, and Lancaster, who had been asked to star in Under Capricorn in 1948. After developing the script with Ernest Lehman for several weeks, they concluded that it couldn't be done without turning the movie into "a boring courtroom drama". 

Hitchcock and Lehman made an appearance before MGM executives telling the story of North by Northwest, and said that MGM would get two films out of Hitchcock under his contract with MGM. However, Hitchcock eventually abandoned the idea of The Wreck of the Mary Deare (which MGM proceeded to make with Cooper and director Michael Anderson) and went ahead with North by Northwest instead.

The Blind Man (1960) 
Following Psycho, Hitchcock re-united with Ernest Lehman for an original screenplay idea: A blind pianist, Jimmy Shearing (a role for James Stewart), regains his sight after receiving the eyes of a dead man. Watching a Wild West show at Disneyland with his family, Shearing would have visions of being shot and would come to realize that the dead man was in fact murdered and the image of the murderer is still imprinted on the retina of his eyes. The story would end with a chase around the ocean liner RMS Queen Mary. Walt Disney reputedly barred Hitchcock from shooting at Disneyland after seeing Psycho. Stewart left the project, Lehman argued with Hitchcock, and the script was never shot.

Lehman's unfinished script was later completed as a radio drama by Mark Gatiss and presented on BBC Radio 4 in 2015.

Village of Stars (1962) 
Hitchcock bought the rights to the 1960 novel Village of Stars by David Beaty (written under the pen name Paul Stanton) after The Blind Man project was canceled. The book follows a Royal Air Force V bomber crew given an order to drop a nuclear bomb, only to have the order aborted. Unfortunately, the bomb is resisting attempts to defuse it and the plane can only stay in flight for a limited time.

Trap for a Solitary Man (1963) 
Trap for a Solitary Man was scheduled to be directed by Hitchcock in widescreen by Twentieth Century-Fox. The story, based on the French play Piege Pour un Homme Seul by M. Robert Thomas, follows a young married couple on holiday in the Alps. The wife disappears, and after a prolonged search the police bring back someone they claim to be her; she even says she is the man's wife, but the man has never seen her before. The play was later adapted three times as television films: Honeymoon With a Stranger (ABC, 1969), One of My Wives Is Missing (ABC, 1976) and Vanishing Act (CBS, 1986).  It had previously been broadly adapted (without attribution) as the 1958 Associated British-Pathé feature Chase a Crooked Shadow.

Mary Rose (1964) 
Hitchcock had long desired to turn J. M. Barrie's 1920 play Mary Rose into a film. In 1964, after working together on Marnie, Hitchcock asked Jay Presson Allen to adapt the play into a screenplay. Hitchcock would later tell interviewers that his contract with Universal Pictures allowed him to make any film, so long as the budget was under $3 million, and so long as it was not Mary Rose. Whether or not this was actually true, Lew Wasserman was not keen on the project, though Hitchcock never gave up hope of one day filming it.

The Three Hostages (1964) 
In 1964, Hitchcock re-read another Richard Hannay novel by John Buchan, The Three Hostages, with a mind to adapting it. As with Greenmantle a quarter of a century earlier, the rights were elusive. But also the story was dated, very much rooted in the 1930s, and the plot involved a villain whose blind mother hypnotizes the hero. Hitchcock, in interviews, said that he felt that the portrayal of hypnosis did not work on film, and that films that attempted this portrayal, in Hitchcock's opinion, turned out poorly.

In 1977, the BBC aired an 85-minute adaptation of The Three Hostages starring Barry Foster, directed by Clive Donner.

Frenzy (a.k.a. Kaleidoscope) (1964–1967) 
Although Hitchcock made a film called Frenzy in 1972, that film's title and some plot points came from an idea Hitchcock had a few years earlier for a prequel to Shadow of a Doubt. Hitchcock approached many writers including Samuel Taylor, Alec Coppel, and Psycho writer Robert Bloch, but in the end engaged an old friend, Benn Levy to flesh out his sketchy idea.

The story (inspired by English serial killers Neville Heath and John George Haigh) would have revolved around a young, handsome bodybuilder who lures young women to their deaths, a version of the character known as 'Merry Widow Murderer' in Shadow of a Doubt. The New York police set a trap for him, with a policewoman posing as a potential victim. The script was based around three crescendos dictated by Hitchcock: the first was a murder by a waterfall; the second murder would take place on a mothballed warship; and the finale, which would take place at an oil refinery with brightly colored drums.

Hitchcock showed his script to his friend François Truffaut. Though Truffaut admired the script, he felt uneasy about its relentless sex and violence. Unlike Psycho, these elements would not be hidden behind the respectable veneer of murder mystery and psychological suspense, and the killer would be the main character, the hero, the eyes of the audience.

Universal vetoed the film, despite Hitchcock's assurances that he would make the film for under $1 million with a cast of unknowns, although David Hemmings, Robert Redford, and Michael Caine had all been suggested as leads. The film — alternatively known as Frenzy or the more "sixties"-esque Kaleidoscope — was not made.

Test footage from this project can be viewed here  and is included in the 1999 TV documentaries Dial H For Hitchcock: The Genius Behind the Showman (Encore) and Reputations: Alfred Hitchcock (A&E/BBC Two).

R.R.R.R. (1965) 
Hitchcock approached Italian comedy-thriller writers Agenore Incrocci and Furio Scarpelli (Age & Scarpelli), writers of Big Deal on Madonna Street, to write a screenplay around an original idea Hitchcock had carried in his head since the late 1930s. A New York City hotel is run by an Italian immigrant who is unaware that his family are using the hotel as cover for crimes, including the theft of a valuable coin from a guest of the hotel. (R.R.R.R. is the highest value of coin.)

The Italian screenwriters struggled with the story, and were not helped by the language barrier.  Universal Pictures were not keen on the idea and persuaded Hitchcock to move on to something else.

The Short Night (1976–1979) 

Hitchcock's last, unfinished project was The Short Night, an adaptation of the spy thriller of the same name by Ronald Kirkbride. A British double agent (loosely based on George Blake) escapes from prison and flees to Moscow via Finland, where his wife and children are waiting. An American agent – whose brother was one of the traitor's victims – heads to Finland to intercept him but ends up falling for the wife. It was Hitchcock's third attempt – after Torn Curtain and Topaz – to produce a "realistic Bond film". Clint Eastwood, and Sean Connery were possible male leads. Liv Ullmann was asked to play the double agent's wife. Catherine Deneuve was also asked to star.  Walter Matthau was considered for the villain role.  Ed Lauter was also discussed for a role as one of Matthau's prison mates.  

The first writer assigned to the picture, James Costigan, quarreled with the director, who asked for him to be paid off. Then Ernest Lehman agreed to work on the script. Lehman felt the story should focus on the American spy, and left out the double agent's jailbreak. Lehman left the film too, and Hitchcock asked old friend Norman Lloyd to help him write a long treatment. Lloyd, like Universal, was concerned that Hitchcock's failing health meant that the movie might not get made. When Hitchcock suggested moving straight on to the screenplay, Lloyd objected, saying they were unprepared. Hitchcock reacted angrily, fired Lloyd, and worked on the treatment alone.

After a while, Hitchcock accepted that he needed another writer to work with him, and Universal suggested David Freeman. Freeman helped Hitchcock complete the treatment and wrote the screenplay. He wrote about his experiences in the 1999 book The Last Days of Alfred Hitchcock, which includes his completed screenplay. The circumstances surrounding Hitchcock's retirement were given by producer Hilton A. Green during the documentary Plotting "Family Plot". According to Green, during pre-production for The Short Night Hitchcock met Green to tell him that his poor health would prevent him from making the film that was to be the follow-up to Family Plot. After trying to talk Hitchcock out of his decision, Green agreed to Hitchcock's request to bring the news of his decision to retire to studio head Lew Wasserman, a long-time friend of Hitchcock.

References 

Unproduced Hitchcock projects
Hitchcock, Alfred